Bernard Lafayette (or LaFayette), Jr. (born July 29, 1940) is an American civil rights activist and organizer, who was a leader in the Civil Rights Movement. He played a leading role in early organizing of the Selma Voting Rights Movement; was a member of the Nashville Student Movement; and worked closely throughout the 1960s movements with groups such as the Student Nonviolent Coordinating Committee (SNCC), the Southern Christian Leadership Conference (SCLC), and the American Friends Service Committee.

Childhood
Lafayette was born and raised in Tampa, Florida. His parents were Bernard Lafayette Sr. and Verdell Lafayette. Bernard was the eldest of eight children. His siblings were Harold Rozelia, Brenda, Geri, Michael, and Victoria. Lafayette spent much of his childhood in Tampa. His family grew up poor, so Bernard started working odd jobs to gain more income by the age of 11. His jobs included cashiering, meat cutting, delivering produce, and collecting change at a coffee shop. When reminiscing on his childhood, Bernard says: "I had to grow up rapidly. In other words, I didn't have a childhood."

Despite being black in the south, Bernard says he went to school in an integrated elementary school, and eventually began to go to schools that were still segregated. While he was at the integrated school he says that "even though it wasn't segregated, I could still see the contrast between the two worlds."  Bernard has clear recollections of some of the racism that he experienced at a young age. When Bernard was seven years old, he was heading downtown with his grandmother, Ma Foster, so they decided to catch a cable car. One of the segregation laws regarding cable cars was that black people would pay at the front door, and then enter through the back door. When His grandmother paid the cable car driver, the driver started driving before either of them could board, pocketing their money and leaving them stranded. He says this is one of the first instances where he realized he wanted to do something about how his people were being treated.

Early adult life and career 
Bernard was married to Kate Bulls Lafayette in 1969. He had two children with his previous wife Colia Liddell Lafayette: Bernard Lafayette III and James Lafayette Sr. According to his children, Bernard was a loving father, who never yelled at, was stern with, or even expressed anger towards his wife or his kids. The family had a very tight-knit relationship, and spent tons of time together. James became an ordained preacher (influenced by his father, who was a religious man), and Lafayette III attended American Baptist College.

As a young man at the age of twenty, Lafayette moved to Nashville, Tennessee, and enrolled in the American Baptist Theological Seminary. During the course of his freshman year, he took classes in nonviolence at the Highlander Folk School run by Myles Horton, and attended many meetings promoting nonviolence. He learned more about the philosophy of nonviolence as lived by Mohandas Gandhi, while taking seminars from activist James Lawson, a well-known nonviolent representative of the Fellowship of Reconciliation.

Lafayette began to use the nonviolent techniques as he became more exposed to the strong racial injustice of the South. In 1959, he, along with his friends Diane Nash, James Bevel, and John Lewis, all members of the Nashville Student Movement, led sit-ins, such as the 1960 Lunch Counter Sit-In, at restaurants and businesses that practiced segregation. As an advocate of nonviolence, in 1960 Lafayette assisted in the formation of the  Student Nonviolent Coordinating Committee (SNCC).

Freedom Rides
In 1961, the Congress of Racial Equality (CORE) initiated a movement to enforce federal integration laws on interstate bus routes. This movement, known as the Freedom Rides, had African American and white volunteers ride together on bus routes through the segregated South. Lafayette wanted to participate, but his parents forbade him. After the Freedom Riders were violently attacked in the city of Anniston, Alabama, the Nashville Student Movement, of which Lafayette was a member, vowed to take over the journey. At the time, some civil rights leaders worried that the Freedom Rides were too provocative and would damage the movement. Despite many doubts, these Nashville students were determined to finish the job.

In May 1961, in the city of Montgomery, Alabama, Lafayette and the other riders were "greeted" at the bus terminal by an angry white mob, members of Ku Klux Klan chapters, and were viciously  attacked. The Freedom Riders were brutally beaten. Their attackers carried every makeshift weapon imaginable: baseball bats, wooden boards, bricks, chains, tire irons, pipes, and even garden tools.

During the Montgomery attack, Lafayette stood firm; his fellow riders William Barbee and John Lewis were beaten until they fell unconscious. Lafayette, Fred Leonard and Allen Cason narrowly escaped being killed by jumping over a wall and running to the post office.  Everyone inside was carrying on individual business, just like nothing was happening outside.  Lafayette later stated, " I thought they were shooting Freedom Riders." It was the gunshot of Alabama's Director of Public Safety, Floyd Mann, who was fighting for the protection of the Freedom Riders.

Lafayette with other Riders was arrested in Jackson, Mississippi, and jailed at Parchman State Prison Farm during June 1961. During Lafayette's participation in civil rights activities, he was beaten and arrested 27 times.

Selma
In the summer of 1962, Lafayette accepted a position with the Student Nonviolent Coordinating Committee (SNCC) to do organizing work in Selma, Alabama alongside his then wife Colia Liddell Lafayette.
Upon arriving in the city in February 1963, he began leading meetings at which he spoke about the condition of African Americans in the South and encouraged local African Americans to share their experiences. He met the representatives of the Dallas County Voters League who impressed him. On the night of June 12, 1963 (the same night that Medgar Evers was murdered in Mississippi), Lafayette was severely beaten by a white assailant. While badly injured, he was not deterred from continuing his work. In late 1964, the board of Southern Christian Leadership Conference (SCLC) decided to join the ongoing Alabama Project organized by James Bevel, Diane Nash, and James Orange, and chose Selma as the focal point to gain voting rights for African Americans. In early 1965, Lafayette, Bevel, Martin Luther King Jr., Orange, Nash and others organized a series of public demonstrations that finally, with the march from Selma-to-Montgomery initiated by Bevel, put enough pressure on the federal government to take action and gave enough support to President Lyndon Johnson for Johnson to demand the drafting and passage of the Voting Rights Act of 1965.

Life after Selma
Lafayette went on to work on the 1966 Chicago Open Housing Movement (he had worked in Chicago earlier with Kale Williams, Bill Moyer, David Jehnsen and other leaders of the American Friends Service Committee).  He later became ordained as a Baptist minister and served as president of the American Baptist Theological Seminary.

In 1973, Lafayette was named first director of the Peace Education Program at Gustavus Adolphus College, Saint Peter, Minnesota. The Gustavus program enabled Lafayette to infuse the entire curriculum of the college with peace education. Lafayette served this Lutheran liberal arts college for nearly three years.  He was also the dean of the graduate school at Alabama State University.

Lafayette has been recognized as a major authority on strategies for nonviolent social change. He is also recognized as one of the leading exponents of nonviolent direct action in the world.

He was a Senior Fellow at the University of Rhode Island, where he helped to found the Center for Nonviolence and Peace Studies. The Center promotes nonviolence education using a curriculum based on the principles and methods of Martin Luther King Jr. He is a Distinguished Scholar-in-Residence at the Candler School of Theology, at Emory University in Atlanta, Georgia. He currently serves as scholar-in-residence at the Caroline Marshall Draughon Center for the Arts & Humanities in the College of Liberal Arts at Auburn University.

Lafayette was honored as a Doctor of Humane Letters from Mount Holyoke College, in May 2012.
In 2014, The University of Rhode Island honored LaFayette with an honorary doctorate in recognition of his lifetime nonviolence leadership for civil and human rights. In 2019 he was awarded the Coretta Scott King Legacy Award by Antioch College's Coretta Scott King Center for Cultural and Intellectual Freedom.

Following Selma, Bernard went on to write several books about his experiences in the civil rights movement and books covering his views and thoughts on nonviolence. These books include The Leaders Manual: A Structured Guide and Introduction to Kingian Nonviolence, The Briefing Booklet: An Orientation to the Kingian Nonviolence Conflict Reconciliation Program, and In Peace and Freedom: My Journey in Selma. His oral history is included in the 2006 book Generation on Fire: Voices of Protest from the 1960s by Jeff Kisseloff.

See also
List of civil rights leaders
List of peace activists

Sources

External links

Bernard LaFayette Jr. and Kathryn Lee Johnson. In Peace and Freedom: My Journey in Selma. Lexington, Kentucky: University Press of Kentucky, 2016.

 SNCC Digital Gateway: Bernard Lafayette, Documentary website created by the SNCC Legacy Project and Duke University, telling the story of the Student Nonviolent Coordinating Committee and grassroots organizing from the inside-out

1940 births
Living people
African-American activists
Activists for African-American civil rights
Freedom Riders
Gandhians
Gustavus Adolphus College faculty
Nashville Student Movement
Nonviolence advocates
People from Tampa, Florida
Selma to Montgomery marches
Student Nonviolent Coordinating Committee
University of Rhode Island faculty
Harvard Graduate School of Education alumni
Alabama State University faculty